The Secretary to the Board of Control was a British government office in the late 18th and early 19th century, supporting the President of the Board of Control, who was responsible for overseeing the British East India Company and generally serving as the chief official in London responsible for Indian affairs. During part of 1834 and from 1835 the post was held by Joint Secretaries. The position was abolished in 1858 with the abolition of the East India Company. It was succeeded by the new position of Under-Secretary of State for India.

Secretaries to the Board of Control, 1784-1858

8 September 1784: Charles William Rouse-Boughton
10 May 1791: Henry Beaufoy
3 July 1793: William Brodrick
19 November 1803: Benjamin Hobhouse
22 May 1804: George Peter Holford
14 February 1806: Thomas Creevey
8 April 1807: George Peter Holford
6 January 1810: Sir Patrick Murray, Bt
14 March 1812: John Bruce
20 August 1812: Thomas Courtenay
2 May 1829: George Bankes
1830: John Stuart-Wortley
1830: Viscount Sandon
1831: Thomas Hyde Villiers
1832: Thomas Babington Macaulay
1833: Robert Gordon  (to 1834)
1834: James Alexander Stewart Mackenzie (to 1834)
1834: Winthrop Mackworth Praed (to 1835)
1835: Sidney Herbert (to 1835)
1835: Robert Gordon (to 1839)
1835: Robert Vernon Smith (to 1839)
1839: Lord Seymour (to 1841)
1839: William Clay (to 1841)
1841: Charles Buller (to 1841)
1841: James Emerson Tennent (to 1845)
1841: Hon. Bingham Baring (to 1845)
1845: Viscount Jocelyn (to 1846)
1845: Viscount Mahon (to 1846)
1846: George Stevens Byng (to 1847)
1846: Thomas Wyse (to 1849)
1847: George Cornewall Lewis (to 1848)
1848: James Wilson (to 1852)
1849: Hon. John Elliot (to 1852)
1852: Henry Baillie (to 1852)
1852: Charles Bruce (to 1852)
1852: Robert Lowe (to 1855)
1852: Thomas Nicholas Redington (permanent)
1855: Henry Danby Seymour
1858: Henry Baillie

British East India Company
Lists of government ministers of the United Kingdom
1858 disestablishments in the United Kingdom
Defunct ministerial offices in the United Kingdom
1784 establishments in the British Empire